Dog Show is the third studio album by the noise rock band God Bullies. It was released in 1990 by Amphetamine Reptile Records.

Track listing

Personnel 
God Bullies
Adam Berg – drums, percussion
Mike Corso – bass guitar, organ
Mike Hard – vocals, sampler
David B. Livingstone – guitar, synthesizer, sampler, engineering, mixing
Production and additional personnel
Michael Cergizan – guitar on "I Am Invisible"
Peter Houpt – slide guitar on "Abigail"
Laura Maloney – photography
Mary Kate Murray – backing vocals
Tabatha Predovich – backing vocals

References

External links 
 

1990 albums
Amphetamine Reptile Records albums
God Bullies albums